The Ministry of Culture (MoC) is a governmental organization in Saudi Arabia was established in June 2018 and responsible for various aspects of Saudi culture. Minister of Culture is Prince Badr bin Farhan Al-Saud who was appointed as its new and first minister.

In line with Vision 2030, the Ministry of Culture will soon announce the formation of 11 specialized cultural bodies. The planned-to-be formed units will cover the areas of museums, movies and visual shows, libraries, fashion, music, heritage, literature and publication, performance arts, visual arts, architecture and interior design, and food and the art of cooking. One of the significant activities the ministry is planning to organize is the International Red Sea Film Festival in Jeddah. The festival will be the first of its kind in Saudi Arabia. The first season will be held in 2020.

The Ministry has been taking measures to improve  the taste of people, promote artists and rehabilitate heritage sites.

In August 2019, the Ministry announced the establishment of three academies dedicated to arts, heritage, and music in the country to receive students and trainees applications. The academies come as part of the Quality of Life Program initiatives and will be offering qualifications in arts.

In February 2020, 11 new cultural authorities were approved by the Saudi Cabinet to promote culture in Saudi Arabia as a lifestyle. These include authorities for films, fashion, music, heritage and the arts.

History 
In 1962, the ministry of information was founded to be in charge of information and media before it was renamed to "Ministry of Culture and Information" in 2003 to include culture affairs under its umbrella. Later, on 1 June 2018 the culture was separated from the media resulting in two different ministries; Ministry of Culture and Ministry of Media.

Nomow Cultural Fund 

In 2019, the Ministry launched the fund to finance and support talents. The fund plans to support professionals working in the fields of writing, publishing, visual content and film making. Moreover, the fund will support every step of the production phases of the cultural work.

See also 

 Ministry of Media

References 

 
1962 establishments in Saudi Arabia
Saudi Arabia
Culture
Saudi Arabia, Culture and Information
2018 establishments in Saudi Arabia